Derbyshire County Cricket Club in 1959 represents the cricket season when the English club Derbyshire had been playing eighty-eight years. It was their fifty-fifth season in the County Championship and they won thirteen matches to finish seventh in the County Championship.

1959 season
Derbyshire played 28 games in the County Championship, one match against Cambridge University, and one against the touring Indians . Despite winning thirteen matches altogether, they ended seventh in the County Championship. Donald Carr was in his fifth season as captain and was top scorer. His 2165 runs was a record for most runs in a season for Derbyshire and he scored two centuries in a match against Kent. He was also Wisden Cricketer of the Year.  Les Jackson took most wickets with 117 and achieved 9 for 17 against Cambridge University. Harold Rhodes played for England during the season.

The team included a considerable amount of fresh blood with Bob Berry Ian Buxton, Peter Eyre, Ian Hall, William Oates and William Richardson, all of whom had sustained careers with Derbyshire.

Matches

{| class="wikitable" width="100%"
! bgcolor="#efefef" colspan=6 | List of matches
|- bgcolor="#efefef"
!No.
!Date
!V
!Result 
!Margin
!Notes
 |- 
|1
| 29 Apr 1959
| Cambridge University  FP Fenner's Ground, Cambridge 
|bgcolor="#00FF00"|Won 
|Innings and 92 runs
|    Douglas-Pennant 5-76; HL Jackson 9-17  
|- 
|2
|9 May 1959
| Northamptonshire  County Ground, Derby 
|bgcolor="#00FF00"|Won 
|4 wickets
|    Subba Row 127; HJ Rhodes 5-65; HL Jackson 5-41 
|- 
|3
|13 May 1959
| Warwickshire  Courtaulds Ground, Coventry 
|bgcolor="#00FF00"|Won 
|167 runs
|    DB Carr 143; Wheatley 5-93; HL Jackson 6-53 
|- 
|4 
|16 May 1959
| Leicestershire Grace Road, Leicester 
|bgcolor="#FFCC00"|Drawn
|
|    Hallam 200; Watson 101*; Spencer 5-69; R Smith 5-81 
|- 
|5
|20 May 1959
|Gloucestershire  County Ground, Derby 
|bgcolor="#FF0000"|Lost 
|48 runs
|    Young 142 
|- 
|6
|23 May 1959
|  WorcestershireQueen's Park, Chesterfield 
|bgcolor="#00FF00"|Won 
|9 wickets
|    Outschoon 112; HL Jackson 5-38; 
|- 
|7
|27 May 1959
| Glamorgan  St Helen's, Swansea 
|bgcolor="#FF0000"|Lost 
|3 wickets
|    Parkhouse 154 
|- 
|8
|30 May 1959
|Middlesex    Lord's Cricket Ground, St John's Wood 
|bgcolor="#00FF00"|Won 
|6 wickets
|    HL Jackson 5-42 
|- 
|9
|6 Jun 1959
| Yorkshire Bramall Lane, Sheffield 
|bgcolor="#FFCC00"|Drawn 
|
|    HL Jackson 5-70; Platt 6-72 
|- 
|10
|10 Jun 1959
| Kent  > Queen's Park, Chesterfield 
|bgcolor="#00FF00"|Won 
|Innings and 21 runs
|    GW Richardson 8-64; Halfyard 7-89; HL Jackson 5-38 
|- 
|11
|13 Jun 1959
| Lancashire  County Ground, Derby 
|bgcolor="#00FF00"|Won 
|7 wickets
|    HL Jackson 6-36 
|- 
|12
|17 Jun 1959
|  Surrey Kennington Oval 
|bgcolor="#FFCC00"|Drawn 
|
|    DC Morgan 5-67 
|- 
|13
|20 Jun 1959
| Nottinghamshire  Trent Bridge, Nottingham 
|bgcolor="#00FF00"|Won 
|4 wickets
|    JM Kelly 113; DC Morgan 5-45 
|- 
|14
|24 Jun 1959
|  Gloucestershire  Ashley Down Ground, Bristol 
|bgcolor="#FF0000"|Lost 
|Innings and 45 runs
|    E Smith 5-70 
|- 
|15
|27 Jun 1959
|Indians Queen's Park, Chesterfield
|bgcolor="#FFCC00"|Drawn 
|
|    Apte 165 
|- 
|16
|4 Jul 1959
| Yorkshire Queen's Park, Chesterfield 
|bgcolor="#FF0000"|Lost 
|6 wickets
|    K Taylor 144 
|- 
|17
|11 Jul 1959
| Lancashire  Old Trafford, Manchester 
|bgcolor="#FFCC00"|Drawn 
|
|    Marner 137; C Lee 109; DB Carr 119  
|- 
|18
|15 Jul 1959
| Somerset Park Road Ground, Buxton 
|bgcolor="#FFCC00"|Drawn 
|
|    Wright 112; Greetham 104 
|- 
|19
|18 Jul 1959
| Warwickshire  Ind Coope Ground, Burton-on-Trent 
|bgcolor="#FF0000"|Lost 
|26 runs
|    M Smith 142; HL Jackson 7-35 and 5-80 
|- 
|20
|25 Jul 1959
|  Sussex   Rutland Recreation Ground, Ilkeston 
|bgcolor="#FFCC00"|Drawn
|
|    Parks 130; Marlar 6-57 
|- 
|21
| 29 Jul 1959
| Glamorgan   Queen's Park, Chesterfield 
|bgcolor="#FFCC00"|Drawn 
|
|    Wooler 7-41; IR Buxton 5-62 
|- 
|22
|1 Aug 1959
| Leicestershire County Ground, Derby 
|bgcolor="#FFCC00"|Drawn 
|
|    Watson 150; DB Carr 109 
|- 
|23
|5 Aug 1959
| Kent  St Lawrence Ground, Canterbury 
|bgcolor="#00FF00"|Won 
|99 runs
|    DB Carr 156* and 109; Pettiford 5-33; GW Richardson 7-31 
|- 
|24
|8 Aug 1959
| Hampshire County Ground, Derby 
|bgcolor="#00FF00"|Won 
|6 wickets
|    IW Hall 113; Shaekleton 7-86; E Smith 5-32 
|- 
|25
|12 Aug 1959
| Essex   Queen's Park, Chesterfield 
|bgcolor="#FFCC00"|Drawn 
|
|    Insole 155; Knight 5-44 
|- 
|26
|15 Aug 1959
|  WorcestershireCounty Ground, New Road, Worcester 
|bgcolor="#00FF00"|Won 
|137 runs
|    Aldridge 5-55; HL Jackson 5-34 and 5-26 
|- 
|27
|19 Aug 1959
| Essex   Vista Road Recreation Ground, Clacton-on-Sea 
|bgcolor="#FF0000"|Lost 
|7 wickets
|    Barker 128*; HL Jackson 6-47 
|- 
|28
|22 Aug 1959
|  Sussex   Manor Sports Ground, Worthing 
|bgcolor="#00FF00"|Won 
|5 wickets
|    Lenham 104; Parks 113; A Hamer 118;E Smith6-44 
|- 
|29
|26 Aug 1959
| Nottinghamshire  County Ground, Derby 
|bgcolor="#00FF00"|Won 
|119 runs
|    Hill 122; Cotton 5-55 
|- 
|30
|29 Aug 1959
 | Hampshire Dean Park, Bournemouth 
|bgcolor="#FFCC00"|Drawn
|
|    Horton 119 
|- 
|

Statistics

County Championship batting averages

Additionally Ray Swallow played in the match against the touring Indians.

County Championship bowling averages

Wicket Keepers
GO Dawkes 	Catches 57, Stumping 5

See also
Derbyshire County Cricket Club seasons
1959 English cricket season

References

1959 in English cricket
Derbyshire County Cricket Club seasons